Kocher is a lunar impact crater located on the lunar far side near the southern pole. The crater is located Southeast of the Ashbrook and Drygalski craters. Kocher was adopted and named after Swiss physician Emil Kocher by the IAU in 2009.

References

External links 
 LAC-144 area – Map of southern lunar pole

Impact craters on the Moon